Dowell Philip O'Reilly (18 July 1865 – 5 November 1923) was an Australian poet, short story writer and politician.

Early life
O'Reilly was born at Sydney. His father, Rev. Thomas O'Reilly, was a well known clergyman of the Church of England, who came of a family with many military and naval associations. Dowell was the son of his second marriage, to a Miss Smith who came from a well-educated and artistic family.  Dowell O'Reilly was educated at Sydney Grammar School, and when his father died he assisted his mother in keeping a preparatory school for boys at Parramatta. In 1884 O'Reilly published a small volume, Australian Poems, and in 1888 a larger volume of verse, A Pedlar's Pack. Both books are now extremely rare. It has been stated that the author destroyed most of the copies of the second volume in his disappointment at its lack of success.

Political career
In 1894 O'Reilly was elected a member of the Legislative Assembly for Parramatta and sat for four years. He moved the first motion in favour of women's suffrage carried in the New South Wales parliament, but was defeated at the 1898 election. He became a master at his old school, the Sydney Grammar School, and continued there for 11 years. In 1910 he again stood for Parramatta, this time as a Labor candidate with the encouragement of Billy Hughes, but was defeated, and shortly afterwards obtained a position in the Sydney land tax branch of the Commonwealth Treasury.  In 1913, Hughes asked O'Reilly about the views of his brother-in-law, Albert Piddington, on states' rights.  O'Reilly cabled Piddington to clarify this, and as a result of Piddington's reply, "In sympathy with supremacy of Commonwealth powers", Hughes appointed him to the Australian High Court.  As a result of opposition to his appointment and his belief that he was compromised by the exchange of cables he resigned without sitting in court.

In 1913 O'Reilly published Tears and Triumph, an expanded short story rather than a novel, in which O'Reilly shows a penetrating knowledge of the feminine view-point. It is a tragic little story, simply and beautifully told, with a running commentary by the author on the philosophy of sex, and it is unique in Australian literature.

In 1895, O'Reilly married Eleanor McCulloch and there were three children of the marriage. During his wife's illness, which lasted for many years, O'Reilly had a difficult and lonely life, which was brightened by a correspondence with a cousin in England whom he had met when she was a child. His father had taken him on a visit to Europe when he was 14. His cousin was too young at the time to have any memory of him, but after the death of O'Reilly's wife in August 1914, the letters gradually developed into love-letters and in June 1917 they were married. Their letters were collected, and published in 1927 under the title of Dowell O'Reilly From his Letters, an illuminating revelation of his interesting personality. In 1920 O'Reilly made a small collection of his short stories from the Sydney Bulletin and other periodicals, and published them under the name of Five Corners. He died after a short illness of cerebrovascular disease and pneumonia at Leura in the Blue Mountains. He was survived by his wife, two sons and a daughter, afterwards Mrs Eleanor Dark, a leading Australian novelist.

Assessment
O'Reilly was remembered as witty, kindly, generously tolerant, and sensitive. Though he did not feel challenged by his work as a schoolmaster, he had a good understanding of boys and gained their affection. Not long before his death he wrote of himself: "I am a failure; I have attempted many things, writing, teaching, politics, drifted along, done just enough to live." This feeling of frustration and failure was characteristic. His early verse was seldom of more than average quality, but the little selection published in 1924 with Tears and Triumph and Five Corners, under the title of The Prose and Verse of Dowell O'Reilly, shows him to be a poet, however limited in output and scope. Five Corners contains some of the best Australian short stories ever written. "His Photo on the wall" is considered a masterpiece for its mingling of humour and tragedy, and his beautiful little sketch, "Twilight" is a triumph in economy of means. O'Reilly wrote so little perhaps because of his tendency towards self-criticism. He was known as a perfectionist.

Bibliography
Poems:
Australian Poems under pseudonym 'D'. (1884)
Pedlar's Pack. (1888)
Short Stories:
Tears and Triumph (1913)
Five Corners. (1920)
Letters:
Dowell O'Reilly From his Letters. (1927)

References

Australian feminist writers
Australian poets
Australian male short story writers
Australian suffragists
Members of the New South Wales Legislative Assembly
1865 births
1923 deaths
People educated at Sydney Grammar School
People from Parramatta
Male feminists